The Yeti, or Abominable Snowman, is a legendary apelike beast said to inhabit the Himalayan region of Nepal and Tibet.

Yeti may also refer to:

People
 Yeti, a ring name of professional wrestler Ron Reis (b. 1970)
 Sarah Urist Green, often referred to as "the yeti" by her husband, John Green, in his YouTube videos

Art, entertainment, and media

Fictional entities
 Yeti (comics), the codenames of two unrelated fictional Marvel Comics characters
 Yeti (Doctor Who), a fictional race of robots, also called Abominable Snowmen, in the Doctor Who universe

Music
 Yeti (album), a 1970 psychedelic rock album by Amon Düül II
 Yeti (band), a British indie rock band

Periodicals
 Yeti (magazine), a series of large-format music magazines featuring music contributions and interviews from predominantly indie artists
 The Yeti (magazine), an independent writing publication from Tallahassee, Florida
 The Yeti with Betty, a comic

Other art, media, and entertainment
 Yeti (film), a 2008 monster movie featured on the Sci Fi Channel
 Yetisports, a Flash game
 Yeti, a combat robot competing in BattleBots

Brands and enterprises
 Yeti (Japanese company), a Japanese visual novel video game company
 Yeti (American company), an American luxury cooler company
 Yeti, a USB microphone from Blue Microphones

Science and technology
 "Yeti crab", an informal name for the genus Kiwa (crustacean)

Transportation
 Yeti, a diesel locomotive on the Snowdon Mountain Railway in Gwynedd, north-west Wales
 Delta Yeti, a mini SUV model built by the Italian car manufacturer Delta Veicoli Speciali
 Škoda Yeti, a mini SUV model built by the Czech car manufacturer Škoda Auto
 Yeti Airlines, an airline based in Nepal
 Yeti Cycles, a bicycle manufacturer in Golden, Colorado

See also
 Abominable Snowman (disambiguation)
 The Yetties, an English folk music group